The 1945 Omloop van Vlaanderen was the inaugural edition of the Omloop van Vlaanderen cycle race and was held on 25 March 1945. The race started and finished in Ghent. The race was won by Jean Bogaerts.

General classification

References

1945
1945 in Belgian sport
1945 in road cycling
March 1945 sports events in Europe